The 1872 Pennsylvania gubernatorial election occurred on October 8, 1872. Incumbent governor John W. Geary, a Republican, was not a candidate for re-election. Republican candidate John F. Hartranft defeated Democratic candidate Charles R. Buckalew to become Governor of Pennsylvania. George Washington Cass, William McClelland, and Hendrick Bradley Wright unsuccessfully sought the Democratic nomination.

Results

References

1872
Pennsylvania
Gubernatorial
October 1872 events